Rotherham Girls' Grammar School was a grammar school in Rotherham.

History
The school was taken over by Rotherham Corporation in 1906. It moved to Middle Lane in 1910. It closed in 1973 and a comprehensive school, Clifton Comprehensive School, opened in the same buildings.

Headmistresses
 1906–1908: Miss Law
 1908–1916: Miss Strudwick
 1916–1920: Miss Smith
 1920–1922: Mrs Mair (née Moss)
 1922–1931: Miss Harding
 1931–1938: Miss Varly
 1938–1946: Miss Dencer
 1947–1953: Miss Ayles
 1953–1960: Mrs Castle
 1960–1973: Mrs Ridge (continued as head of Clifton Comprehensive School)

References

1906 establishments in England
1973 disestablishments in England
Defunct grammar schools in England
Defunct schools in Rotherham
Educational institutions disestablished in 1973
Educational institutions established in 1906
Girls' schools in South Yorkshire